Anders Koogi (born 8 September 1979) is a Danish footballer who played in The Football League for Peterborough United.

References

Danish men's footballers
Norwich City F.C. players
Peterborough United F.C. players
English Football League players
People from Roskilde
1979 births
Living people
Association football midfielders
Sportspeople from Region Zealand